Omega (stylized as Ωmega) is the eighth studio album by the Dutch symphonic metal band Epica. It was released on 26 February 2021 via Nuclear Blast.

Production 
Simone Simons had stated on 1 February 2020 that pre-production for the next album had been completed. On 11 March 2020, the band entered the studio to begin recording their album, while in turn released studio vlogs showing the album making process for the studio album.

Mark Jansen had said in an interview that the album's release date could be delayed as a result of the COVID-19 pandemic affecting the recording sessions. It was reported that on 17 April 2020 that Simone Simons had finished recording vocals for the new album. Mark Jansen later confirmed on September 2, 2020 that the album had been recorded, mixed and mastered with orchestrations and choir having been wrapped up before the band began recording.

On 6 January 2021, it was confirmed that Vicky Psarakis (The Agonist) and Zaher Zorgati (Myrath) would provide guest vocals on the album, for the songs "Twilight Reverie – The Hypnagogic State" and "Code of Life".

In the fourteenth vlog documenting the production of the album which was released on the band's YouTube channel on 9 February 2021, Jansen discussed the concept of the album itself: "We as humanity, we were drifting apart like competition, you see that in the corporations' competition. And while we in fact, flourish while we are working together." Regarding the album title, he stated additionally: "There was the Omega Point theory that comes to the surface in the lyrics and the Omega Point theory, is dealing about the scientific speculation and spiritual view that we are, fated to spiral towards one point of divine unification."

Composition

Influences, style and themes 
When asked about the theme behind the seventh track "Freedom – The Wolves Within", Jansen stated that the song is "based on an old story of a fight between two wolves. What we want to be and what we want to reflect on the world around us depends on which wolf we feed and also the degree of control we have over our inner wolves."

According to Jansen, "Kingdom of Heaven, Part III – The Antediluvian Universe" is the final part of the "Kingdom of Heaven" series. He stated: "This is the third and final 'Kingdom of Heaven' song. It's our eighth studio album. The number eight is also very spiritual because if you put it on the side, it's the infinity symbol. 'Kingdom of Heaven' is about life after death, and it's also number eight on the album. So there is a lot of hidden symbolism on the album and in the artwork. The big life question, 'What is the true meaning of life?' How do we navigate through life within ourselves? We are all 'yin and yang.' We are all made out of light and dark. We all have this labyrinth within ourselves in which we have to navigate ourselves. We hopefully find our way out of the labyrinth and don't get lost within the labyrinth of ourselves."

According to Simons, the ninth track "Rivers" symbolizes the calmness and at the same time the uncertainty in life, the ebb and flow. She stated that the calm water represents peace, and a strong river stream means that you "have to face challenges and swim against the tide of life."

Release and promotion 
On 9 October 2020, the first single off of the album, "Abyss of Time – Countdown to Singularity", was released with an official videoclip. The second single off of the album, "Freedom – The Wolves Within", was released on 27 November 2020 along with a music video. Both singles had amassed over three million streams online since their release. A music video for the acoustic version of "Abyss o' Time" was released on 18 December 2020. The third single, "Rivers", was released on 22 January 2021 along with a visualizer video. The fourth single, "Omegacoustic", is the acoustic version of "Omega – Sovereign of the Sun Spheres" and was released on 15 February 2021 along with a music video. Another videoclip, for "The Skeleton Key", was released on the same day as the album.

On 29 April 2021, the band announced that they would be performing a livestream event titled Omega Alive in support of the album which took place on 12 June 2021. The livestream event featured the biggest production with visual surprises as well as songs from the album.

Critical reception 

The album received generally positive reviews from music critics upon the album's release.

Distorted Sound scored the album 8 out of 10 and said: "Where previous albums The Quantum Enigma and The Holographic Principle often delved into scientific principles, Omega opts to take a personal, individual approach to these themes. Drawing heavily on the Emerald Tablets, an ancient source of alchemical knowledge, as well as scientific principles and on individual experiences, the band weave these concepts and their music together into what can only accurately be described as epic. This level of scale and ambition is nothing new for Epica but after five years without new music and emerging into a world changed beyond all recognition since they last recorded, Omega stands as both a fitting conclusion to the trilogy that started with The Quantum Engima and as the bold start of a brand new era."

Kerrang! gave the album 4 out of 5 with writer Steve Beebee stating: "Omega proves that as bombastic as symphonic metal gets, it's no different to any other genre in that, ultimately, it's all about the songs. And these songs are Epica's best."

Metal Hammer gave the album a positive review and stated: "Never ones to disappoint, Epica once again reach their epic quotient on Omega without choking, perhaps proving that too much of a good thing is a good thing."

Track listing

Notes
 The earbook edition of the album includes a third disc (Opus Ωmega, containing the orchestral versions of disc one) and a fourth disc (Ωmega Instrumental, containing the instrumental versions of disc one).

Personnel 
Credits for Omega adapted from liner notes.

Epica
 Simone Simons – lead vocals, backing vocals
 Mark Jansen – grunts, rhythm guitar
 Isaac Delahaye – lead, rhythm and acoustic guitar, orchestral snare drum, orchestral toms
 Coen Janssen – synths, grand piano, glockenspiel, tubular bells, orchestral snare drum, orchestral toms, Gran casa, bongos, finger cymbals, tambourine, shaker, barchimes, choir arrangements, choir scoring, orchestral arrangements, additional samples and effects
 Rob van der Loo – bass
 Ariën van Weesenbeek – drums, additional grunts, orchestral snare drum, orchestral toms

Additional personnel
Marcela Bovio – backing vocals
Linda Janssen – backing vocals
Zaher Zorgati (Myrath) – arabic vocals and translations
Paul Babikian – spoken words
Vicky Psarakis (The Agonist) – spoken words

Choir – Kamerkoor PA'dam 
Maria van Nieukerken – choir director
Angus van Grevenbroek, Alfrun Schmidt, Annemarie Verburg, Annemieke Nuijten, Annette Vermeulen, Cecile Roovers, Frédérique Klooster, Guido Groenland, Henk Gunneman, Jan Douwes, Jan Hoffmann, Joost van Velzen, Karne Langnedonk, Martha Bosch, Martijn de Graaf Bierbrauwer, René Veen

Children's Choir – Zangschool BrabantTalent 
Gert Oude Sogtoen – choir director
Floor-Anne van Vliet – vocal coach
Alex Boegheim, Annejet Beuker, Anne Jacobs, Anne van Hoek, Anne Pepers, Babette Barnhoorn, Bas Stokkermans, Cato Janssen, Daan Karstens, Elin Rikken, Eline van den Hoven, Emma Masarovic, Eva van de Wettering, Fee Sannen, Femme Janssen, Femke Kempkes, Fieke van den Bogaart, Floris Bergen, Hazel Setton, Holly van Zoggel, Hugo Bergen, Ilse van Eek, India Mélotte, Janita Bekkering, Jasmijn Jeurissen, Jazz Fafié, Job Stokkermans, Jula van de Wijngaard, Julian van Neerven, Juniper Setton, Laura Kempkes, Laura van Kollenburg, Lieke van der Aa, Lotte Spohr, Luna Legel, Madeleine Dechesne, Manou Garnier, Marloes Woudsma, Miloe Verdoorn, Nina Megens, Nienke van Eek, Noor Saras, Pam Roelofs, Pleun Couwenhoven, Pleun Tibosch, Poppy Setton, Pepijn Janssen, Renee Meenderink, Renske Bakker, Roos Derks, Saar Muis, Saar van Uden, Sarah Florie, Sterre Mélotte, Suze van Haaren, Tess van de Beek, Veerke van Rooij, Victoria Karimov, Vincent van Duren, Zoë Loeffen

The City of Prague Philharmonic Orchestra

Adam Klemens – orchestral conductor
Marie Dvorská – violin
Petr Pavlíček – violin
Jana Hřebíková – violin
Milan Lajčík – violin
Miluše Kaudersová – violin
Bohumil Kotmel – violin
Petra Bohm – violin
Karla Lobovská – violin
Karel Vidimský – violin
Miloš Černý – violin
Iva Jaške Příhonská – violin
Libor Kaňka – violin
Miroslav Kosina – violin
Anna Lundáková – violin
Ondřejka Dlouhá – violin
Igor Lecian – violin
Jiři Sládek – violin
Stanislav Rada – violin
Lukáš Cach – viola
Miroslav Novotný – viola
Tomáš Kamarýt – viola
Boris Goldstein – viola
Jaromír Páviček – viola
Milan Souček – viola
Martin Adamovič – viola
Marek Elznic – cello
Pavel Běloušek – cello
Ctibor Příhoda – cello
Kryštof Lecian – cello
Vojtěch Masnica – double bass
Rostislav Dvrdík – double bass
Tomáš Josífko – double bass
Jiři Skuhra – flute
Zdeněk Rys – oboe
Aleš Hustoles – clarinet
Luboš Hucek – bassoon
Marek Zvolánek – trumpet
Svatopluk Zaal – trumpet
Martin Pavluš – trumpet
Stanislav Penk – trombone
Aleš Vopelka – trombone
Tomáš Bialko – trombone
František Pok – French horn
Jiři Lisý – French horn
Jan Mach – French horn
Pavel Jirásek – French horn
Luděk Hrabec – tuba

Additional orchestra
Jeroen Goossens – flute, bass flute, piccolo, clarinet, ney, bansuri, low whistle, tin whistle
Sandip Banerjee – sitar, santoor, sarod, bansuri, didgeridoo, tabla, pakhwaz, mridangam, ghatam, tavil, ganjira, dafli, gang
Igor Hobus – orchestral snare drum, orchestral toms, gong, suspended symbal, cymbal a due, congas

Production
Joost van den Broek – engineering, editing, mixing, vocal arrangements, arrangements, orchestral arrangements, congas, additional samples and effects
Jos Driessen – engineering, editing
Jens Kothe – engineering
Jan Holzner – engineering
Kevin Codfert – engineering
Christian Donaldson – engineering
Darius van Helfteren – mastering
Stáňa Vomáčková – translator
Josef Pokluda – contractor
Jérôme Bailly – co-writer (tracks 1, 2, 11)
Sascha Paeth – vocal arrangements
Ben Mathot – orchestral scoring
Adam Denlinger – English coach, lyrical advice
Jaap Toorenaar – Latin translations
Gjalt Lucassen – Latin translations
Stefan Heilemann – art direction, design, photography
Tim Tronckoe – photography
Ferdinando Scavone – photography
Ettore Maria Garozzo – photography
Emir Medic – styling

Charts

References 

Epica (band) albums
2021 albums
Nuclear Blast albums